The Ngiti , or South Lendu, is an ethnolinguistic group located in the Ituri Province of the Democratic Republic of the Congo. Ngiti speakers call their language Ndruna.  In 1991, the Ngiti numbered 100,000 located in the Irumu territory south of Bunia.  During the Ituri conflict, the Front for Patriotic Resistance in Ituri was formed as a Ngiti militia group and political party.

Phonology

Unusual numeral system 

Ngiti is reported to have a base-32 number system with base-4 cycles.  The following is a list of some Ngiti numerals.

Notes and references 

Central Sudanic languages